Condukiidae is a family of crustaceans belonging to the order Amphipoda.

Genera:
 Condukius Barnard & Drummond, 1982
 Otagia Barnard & Karaman, 1991

References

Amphipoda